Fresh Horses may refer to:

 Fresh Horses (film), 1988 coming of age drama film
 Fresh Horses (album), 1995 album by Garth Brooks
 Fresh Horses, 2004 album by Jim Byrnes